Discohelicidae is an extinct family of sea snails with planispiral shells, marine gastropod mollusks in the clade Vetigastropoda (according to the taxonomy of the Gastropoda by Bouchet & Rocroi, 2005).

This family has no subfamilies.

Genera 
Genera within the family Discohelicidae include:

 Amphitomaria
 Discohelix
 Spiniomphalus

References